"Shaving Cream" is a song written by Benny Bell in 1946, and originally sung by Paul Wynn. It is a novelty song in which each verse ends with a mind rhyme of shit, the initial sh- segueing into the refrain, "Shaving Cream"; for example:

"I have a sad story to tell you
It may hurt your feelings a bit
Last night when I walked into my bathroom
I stepped in a big pile of ...shhhhh . . . aving cream."

The original version of "Shaving Cream" was issued on Bell's Cocktail Party Songs record label in 1946, with Phil Winston on vocals under the pseudonym Paul Wynn, and, as that name was also used by Bell himself, Winston's version has often been mistaken for Bell's, and has appeared on Benny Bell compilation albums more frequently than Bell's own version.

After the song began to be played on the Dr. Demento radio show in the 1970s, disc jockey Bruce Morrow on WNBC radio in New York also played it, resulting in "Shaving Cream" becoming the station's most requested record during the last week of 1974. Vanguard Records reissued the song in 1975, and it became a hit, peaking at #30 on the Billboard Hot 100 chart. Early copies of the 1975 Vanguard single credited Bell as the performer. However, after controversy ensued, the same recording was re-released with revised labels crediting Paul Wynn as performer.

A remake of "Shaving Cream" performed as a duet with Dr. Demento was released on the albums Dr. Demento's Dementia Royale and Dr. Demento's 25th Anniversary Collection. Dr. Demento occasionally performed the song live in concert with "Weird Al" Yankovic's band (Yankovic playing accordion). Another 1970s cover version was recorded by a soca group, The Fabulous Five.

Dave Van Ronk performed this song at his shows over the years, and a version is included on the CD of rarities, The Mayor of MacDougal Street. He modifies the trick of the song by changing the last line to "stick your head in a bucket of shit" rather than "a bucket of shaving cream".

On the 2017 revival of The Gong Show, this song was performed as an intermission partway through each show, and was sung in audience sing-along fashion, led by a staff performer named Albert. However, the segment was discontinued in season two.

See also
Vanguard Records
List of 1970s one-hit wonders in the United States

References

Novelty songs
1946 songs
1975 singles
Comedy songs
Vanguard Records singles